The 1973 South Australian state election was held on 10 March 1973.

Retiring Members

Labor
 John Clark MHA (Elizabeth)

Liberal and Country
 David Brookman MHA (Alexandra)
 James Ferguson MHA (Goyder)
 Joyce Steele MHA (Davenport)

House of Assembly
Sitting members are shown in bold text. Successful candidates are highlighted in the relevant colour. Where there is possible confusion, an asterisk (*) is also used.

Legislative Council
Sitting members are shown in bold text. Successful candidates are highlighted in the relevant colour and identified by an asterisk (*).

References

Candidates for South Australian state elections
1973 elections in Australia
1970s in South Australia